Syberia is an adventure video game franchise created by Belgian artist Benoît Sokal

Syberia may also refer to:
Syberia (video game), the inaugural entry of the Syberia franchise
The Polish name for Siberia, a region of Russia
Syberia, Łódź Voivodeship (central Poland)
Syberia, Mława County in Masovian Voivodeship (east-central Poland)
Syberia, Żuromin County in Masovian Voivodeship (east-central Poland)
Syberia (album), album by Hamlet

See also
Cyberia (disambiguation)
Siberia (disambiguation)